Sanganoni pally is a small village located in Mahbubnagar district, Telangana, India.
The population of the village is about 600.

References

Villages in Mahbubnagar district